Yantai Laishan Airport is a military airport in Yantai in Shandong, China. It formerly also served as the civil airport of Yantai, until it was replaced by Yantai Penglai International Airport which was opened on 28 May 2015.

Laishan Airport was originally a military airport operated by the People's Liberation Army Navy. In June 1984, the Chinese government and Central Military Commission agreed to open the airport to civil flights, which began operation in October 1984 with flights to Beijing and Shanghai. On October 24, 1986, PLAAF pilot Zheng Caitian flew his Shenyang J-6 from Laishan airport to Seoul Air Base and when he reached Taiwan. During the 31 years of its commercial operation, traffic grew significantly, and the airport served flights between Yantai and more than 70 Chinese cities, as well as several international destinations including Seoul and Busan in South Korea. As the existing facilities could not meet the growing demands of the city, the Yantai government began construction of Penglai International Airport in September 2011. In 2014, its last full year as a civil airport, Laishan served more than four million passengers.

See also
List of airports in China
List of the busiest airports in China
List of People's Liberation Army Air Force airbases

References

Airports in Shandong
Defunct airports in China
Airports established in 1984
1984 establishments in China
Chinese Air Force bases
Yantai
Airports disestablished in 2015